Lješnica is a settlement in Petnjica Municipality in northeastern Montenegro. It was formerly part of the Berane Municipality.

Geography

History

Demographics

Populated places in Petnjica Municipality
Serb communities in Montenegro